Marnon-Thomas Busch (born 8 December 1994) is a German professional footballer who plays as a right-back for 1. FC Heidenheim in the 2. Bundesliga.

Club career
Busch joined from Werder Bremen's youth system in 2007 from TuS Güldenstern Stade. He made his Werder Bremen II debut during the 2012–13 season. On 24 August 2014, he made his first team debut in a Bundesliga game against Hertha BSC replacing Izet Hajrović after 85 minutes in a 2–2 draw at the Olympiastadion in Berlin.

In June 2016, Busch joined 2. Bundesliga side 1860 Munich on loan for the 2016–2017 season. At the end of the season, the club was relegated.

In June 2017, Busch signed a three-year contract with 1. FC Heidenheim, also of the 2. Bundesliga.

References

Living people
1994 births
People from Stade
German footballers
Footballers from Lower Saxony
Association football fullbacks
Germany youth international footballers
SV Werder Bremen players
SV Werder Bremen II players
TSV 1860 Munich players
1. FC Heidenheim players
Bundesliga players
2. Bundesliga players
3. Liga players